Events in the year 1810 in Norway.

Incumbents
Monarch: Frederick VI

Events
11 January - Prince Frederik of Hesse is appointed Steward of Norway.
23 July - Battle of Silda.
30 November - The Norwegian Government commission was dissolved.

Arts and literature
Det Dramatiske Selskab in Laurvig is founded.
The construction of Lade Mansion in Trondheim is finished.

Births
20 January – Gustav Christian Gjøs, politician (d.1889)
5 February – Ole Bull, violinist (d.1880)
17 April – Johan Reinert Reiersen,  emigration activist and early Texas pioneer (d.1864)
25 September – Peder Sather, banker and philanthropist (d.1886)
15 December – Peter Andreas Munch, University  professor and historian (d.1863)

Full date unknown
Simon Karenius Høegh, bank treasurer, merchant and politician (d.1893)
Ole Hovelsen Mustad,  businessperson and politician (d.1884)

Deaths
1 November - Frederik Georg Adeler, county official and landowner (b.1736)

See also